is an anime television series produced by Dynamic Planning and animated by Toei Animation. The series is a comedic parody of various mecha series produced by Toei, anthropomorphizing robots from those series into magical girls. The series aired on the Toei Channel between January 4, 2014 and March 2, 2014 and was simulcast by Crunchyroll. A preview was streamed on YouTube on October 18, 2013.

Characters

Robot Girls

Team Z
 

The leader of Team Z. Z-chan is hotblooded and impulsive usually destroying city blocks while paying no mind to the destruction she causes. She is often called a kid with strong athletic abilities by Gre-chan due to this. However Z-chan likes to fight evil, while causing a bit more mayhem than her enemies do and having little interest in justice. 
 

The youngest member of the team. Compared to her teammates, she speaks very little and is rather cynical, quite often judging others for their flaws, including Z-chan who she calls a "kid" despite Z-chan being a little older than her. She always says she dislikes athletic girls, particularly Z-chan. Despite the harsh treatment she gives Z-chan, Gre-chan appears to actually like her as she expressed some concern when Minerva X appeared to be around Z-chan and started to cry when Z-chan said she hated her. She is often seen holding something in her hands such as a digital camera or a portable gaming system. 
 

Grenda-san is the more sophisticated member of her team and is generally friendly and unfussy. However, she has a sadistic side where she has thoughts of punishing people in embarrassing ways. Grenda-san is a big fan Rhine X especially of Rhine X1 and did everything she could to avoid listening to the singing of Belgas V5 out of personal preference.

Team G

Team T
 

Has a personality similar to Z-Chan's.
 

 

Acts like a bratty little girl
 

A shy and caring girl

Underground Empire

Leader of the Underground Empire and creator of the Mechanical Beasts Girls, who only appears as a pair of eyes on a screen.

Ashura is a loyal member of the Underground Empire, serving Dr. Hell in his quest for world domination and following his command to get what they need in order to achieve that goal. She acts similar to an older sister to the Mechanical Beast Girls and looks out for them, once even ignoring a message from Dr. Hell to look after Doublas M2. . Her appearance is split, one side male, the other side female.

Doublas has the speech and mannerisms of a shy little girl that gets scared when defeated badly. While capable of speaking in a regular fashion, Doublas prefers to speak through her handpuppets and becomes insecure without them. 

 
Garada is a tomboy who likes to fight, but she has a weak spirit as shown when she and Doublas break down after their humiliating defeat at the hand of the Robot Girls. 

Gromazen R9 is a hardworking and peppy young girl, yet gets down on herself hard when she fails miserably at something as she considered suicide after a branch of failures against the Robot Girls. 

 
Gaia has the mannerisms of an overly detailed nerd when speaking about her magnetic abilities. She is able to make a comeback after a misunderstanding but gets down on herself rather easily after her own abilities turn on her. 

 
Kingdan is very shy and panics rather easily in a manner similar to stage fright. She is also very apologetic for her weakness. 

 
Baranga is a ditzy masochist who received sexual pleasure when she got hurt or was bound. She first appears as a giant sea urchin. 

 
Glossam has a snobbish attitude with a short-temper and verbally abuses others whether ally or enemy, calling Baron Ashura 'granny' for example. 

 
Poses first appears as a giant seahorse and is loyal to her creator and his ideals for world domination, she dislikes being ignored which happens quite a lot. She tends to end her sentences with '-kro'. 

An Underground Empire spy who is actually a crossdressing boy. Minerva has a crush on Z-chan and strives to get her attention. When it comes to others however such as the other members of team Z, he badmouths them and considers them unworthy of Z-chan's attention especially Gre-chan. 

Belgas has a good singing voice that can entrance others and make them experience mood swings. But when this fails, she sings in a destructive sound.

Others

 
 
A former idol singer and member of Rhine X, who now runs a Resort. Yoko is a good natured person, who is generally friendly and polite, but can be merciless when she needs to be, especially when someone is threatening her resort. Her voice causes destructive sound waves.

Episodes

Robot Girls Z (2014)

Robot Girls Z Specials (2014)
Unaired special episodes 3.5, 6.5, and 9.5 included with the Blu-ray/DVD releases.

Robot Girls Z Plus (2015)

Media

Games
A browser-based multiplayer PC game titled Robot Girls Z Online has been announced. Robot Girls Z will also have cameo appearances within the PlayStation Vita game ''Ar Nosurge Plus.

References

External links
 

2010s animated comedy television series
Comedy anime and manga
Mecha anime and manga
Slice of life anime and manga
Moe anthropomorphism
Toei Animation television